Bulelwa Mkutukana, best known by her stage name Zahara, is a South African singer and songwriter born on November 9, 1987.

After signing a record deal with TS Records, Mkutukana's debut album, Loliwe (2011), went double platinum. Her second album, Phendula (2013), produced three chart-topping singles "Phendula", "Impilo", and "Stay".

Zahara's third album, Country Girl (2015), was certified triple platinum. Following her departure from TS Records, she signed a record deal with Warner Music. Her fourth album, Mgodi (2017), was her best-selling album and was certified platinum.

Her fifth album, Nqaba Yam (2021), peaked at number 1 on iTunes.

Her accolades include 17 South African Music Awards, three Metro FM Awards, and one Nigeria Entertainment Awards. Zahara was on the 2020 list of the BBC's 100 Women. She appeared as a guest judge on the seventeenth season of Idols South Africa in 2021.

Early life 
Zahara was born 'Bulelwa Mkutukana' in the Phumlani Informal Settlement outside of East London in Eastern Cape, South Africa. She lived there with her parents Nokhaya and Mlamli Mkutukana, and is the sixth of seven children. Zahara started singing in her school's choir when she was six years old, and at the age of nine she was asked to join the senior choir because of her strong voice. Her stage name means "blooming flower". As a child, she was known by the nickname "Spinach".

Career 
Zahara's music is classified loosely as "Afro-soul" and she sings in her native language, Xhosa, as well as in English. Her music has been described as a mixture of styles popularized by Tracy Chapman and India Arie.

Zahara started her career busking on the streets of East London. She was signed to the label TS Records by TK Nciza.

Zahara's debut album Loliwe was released in 2011. The first issue sold out within 72 hours. By 19 days later the album sold more than 100,000 copies, reaching double platinum status in South Africa. This made her the second musician to reach this figure in such record time after Brenda Fassie, also a Xhosa native. Zahara released her first live DVD The Beginning Live in 2012, featuring X-Factor USA contestant LeRoy Bell. The DVD reached platinum in one day,  according to the standards set by the Recording Industry of South Africa.

On 1 May 2012, at the annual South African Music Awards, Zahara won eight awards, including "Best Female Artist" and "Album of the Year".

In 2013, Zahara released her second studio album, Phendula, which won three South African Music Awards for Best Selling Album, Best R&B, Soul and Reggae Album and Best Female Artist of the Year. The same year, Nelson Mandela invited her to his home to perform a private bedside concert. She then composed "Nelson Mandela" in his honor and released it as an EP.

2014–2018: Country Girl, Mgodi 
In July 2014, Zahara's younger brother was murdered in East London. According to Zahara, she went through a period of depression after his death, but recovered enough for the 2015 release of Country Girl. In 2015 at the Eastern Cape Music Awards, she won the two awards "Best Female" and "Best Artist 3".

In early 2017, Zahara signed with Warner Music South Africa. On October 13, 2017, she released her fourth studio album Mgodi. The album went gold after only six hours. To further support the album, Zahara embarked on her Africa All Star Music Festival, visiting three venues in United States. The tour began in Toronto, Canada, on 17 August 2019, and concluded on 24 August 2019, in Washington DC.

Mgodi won Best Female Act at the 2018 Next Generation Entertainment Awards.

2021–2023: Nqaba Yam 
Following a four-year hiatus, Zahara announced her fifth studio album on CapeTalk site, and later released the album's lead single "Nyamezela" on 7 May 2021.  On 30 July 2021, she released a second single "Nqaba Yam". The album was initially set to be released on 9 July 2021, but was delayed due to COVID-19 lockdowns and finally released on 13 August 2021.

In December 2021, she teased her first Amapiano single on Twitter.

Television 
In 2021, she made her television debut as guest judge for Idols South Africa season 17, alongside Dineo Ranaka.

Discography 
 Loliwe (2011)
The Beginning Live (2012)
 Phendula (2013)
 Country Girl (2015)
 Mgodi (2017)
 Nqaba Yam'' (2021)

Awards and nominations 

Notes
A  The Metro FM Music Awards did not hold in 2012 due to re-positioning. The award ceremony was held in 2013.

References 

1987 births
Living people
South African singer-songwriters
Xhosa people
People from East London, Eastern Cape
People from Buffalo City Metropolitan Municipality
21st-century South African women singers
South African guitarists
21st-century guitarists
BBC 100 Women
21st-century women guitarists